Jérôme Nadal (in Spanish: Jerónimo Nadal) was born on 11 August 1507 in Palma De Mallorca, in the Balearic Islands, Spain, and died on 3 April 1580 in Rome. He was a Spanish Jesuit priest in the first generation of the companions of St. Ignatius of Loyola. A very close collaborator of St. Ignatius of Loyola, the founder of the Society of Jesus, he was sent to explain to the various Jesuit communities of Europe the first draft of the Constitutions. He is known as the "Ignatian theologian" for having developed the theology behind Ignatian spirituality.

Elements of biography 
Born in Palma de Mallorca on 11 August 1507, Jerome was the eldest of four children of Antonio Nadal, a lawyer by profession, and Maria Morey. Nadal studied at the University of Alcalá de Henares (1526) where he met Ignatius for the first time. He kept his distance from Ignatius at this point, since Ignatius was in trouble with the Inquisition.

In autumn 1532 Nadal went to the University of Paris to continue his studies. He felt attracted to the priesthood and, while studying mathematics, began to study theology. In the Latin Quarter he ran across his fellow student from Alcalá, Ignatius of Loyola, along with Ignatius' group of "friends in the Lord", Peter Faber, Francis Xavier, and Diego Laynez among others. But he stubbornly refused to join these "alumbrados" whom he mistrusted. He preferred, he said, the Gospel to their "Spiritual Exercises", fearing "to be dragged out of orthodoxy".

Like other Spaniards, he had to leave Paris for political reasons in 1536, and continued his training at the University of Avignon (then an enclave of the Papal States). There he gained a remarkable mastery of Hebrew, to the admiration of the Jewish community of the "City of the Popes". He was offered the position of spiritual director and chief rabbi of Avignon! ... which troubled him.

In April 1536 he was ordained a priest by the auxiliary bishop of Avignon, Simon de Podio, and on 11 May he was awarded a doctorate in theology.

Returning to his native island and setting himself up for a comfortable ecclesiastical career, he awoke from a "deep sleep" by reading a copy of the famous letter sent from India by St. Francis Xavier to the clerics of Paris, apostrophising those who, "at the University of Paris, have more knowledge than a willingness to prepare themselves to draw fruit from it." He became unsettled. He inquired and discovered "Ignatius is superior general! Xavier is in India! A religious order, the 'Society of Jesus', is approved! What amazing developments! I will immediately go to Rome to meet Ignatius and find out what happened."

He went to Rome and at thirty-eight entered the Society of Jesus. Ignatius quickly noticed his gifts and made him a trusted associate, a "contemplative in action" as Nadal would describe the Ignatian ideal.

He was entrusted the important task of founding the Jesuit College, Messina, the first college opened by the Jesuits, in 1548.

He proceeded to travel and explain the newly formulated Constitutions of the Society of Jesus to the Jesuits in Italy, Spain, and Portugal. He reported to Ignatius the reactions, which were incorporated into the final draft of the Constitutions.

In 1554 Ignatius, two years before his death, appointed Nadal Vicar General of the Society. At the General Congregation of 1558, which elected Diego Laynez as Ignatius' successor, as well as later, he was often consulted as being the one who, having been a very close collaborator with the Society's founder, best expressed his thoughts.

Jerome Nadal died on 3 April 1580 at the San Andrea del Quirinale novitiate in Rome.

Evangelical images 

The Spiritual Exercises of Ignatius of Loyola employ as a higher form of prayer what Ignatius calls the "application of the senses" to the scenes in the Gospels. By contemplating these scenes, along with Jesus' words and actions, one is able to take on the values of Jesus in one's own life. Shortly before Ignatius' death, he asked Nadal to oversee a project of producing engravings to facilitate these "contemplations" of Jesus in the Gospels. These were meant especially to assist Jesuit novices, for a thirty-day retreat using the Spiritual Exercises was a part of every Jesuit's novitiate.

Nadal commissioned several artists to do the engravings, 153 in all, and himself wrote extended captions which included references to parts of the scenes. The engravings, Evangelicae Historiae Imagines, were published in Antwerp in 1593, thirteen years after Nadal's death. This is the oldest collection of such engravings that are extant; they use the art of perspective which was new at the time.

See also 
 Ignatius of Loyola
 Society of Jesus

References

Bibliography
 Miguel Nicolau: Jeronimo Nadal: Obras y doctrinas espirituales , Madrid, 1949.
 Miguel Nicolau: Article Nadal (Jerome) in the Dictionary of Spirituality , vol.11, col.3-15, Paris, Beauchesnes, 1982.
 Manuel Ruiz Jurado: Cronologia of the vida del Fr. Jerónimo Nadal SI (1507-1580) , in AHSI , vol.48 (1979), p. 248.
 Joseph F. Conwell: Contemplation in action; a study in Ignatian prayer , Spokane, 1957.
 ( In ) William Bangert: Jerome Nadal, SJ 1507-1580; Tracking the First Generation of Jesuits , Chicago, Loyola University press, 1992, 401pp.
 Contemplative in action; Jerome Nadal , Ed. Desclée de Brouwer, Coll. Christus, Paris, 2002, 366 p.

1507 births
1580 deaths
University of Paris alumni
16th-century Spanish Jesuits